William Alexander Brown  (13 December 1922 – 5 December 1984) was a British military officer based in British-ruled India. He is best known for his actions during the Partition of India, when he assisted the locals of the Gilgit Agency and led a coup d'état against Hari Singh, the Maharaja of the erstwhile princely state of Jammu and Kashmir. The successful coup ultimately resulted in the Gilgit Agency (in today's Gilgit−Baltistan) becoming a part of Pakistani-administered Kashmir following the First Indo−Pakistani War.

Early life and education
Brown was born in Melrose, Scotland. His father William Brown had served with the Gordon Highlanders regiment of the British Army during World War I, and was a recipient of the Military Cross. His paternal grandfather Alexander Laing Brown had been a Liberal Unionist member of parliament for the Hawick Burghs between 1886 and 1892. Brown attended St. Mary's School in Melrose and George Watson's College in Edinburgh. Upon finishing his schooling in 1941, he enlisted in the Argyll and Sutherland Highlanders regiment, and sailed for India in December of that year.

Arrival in British India
Following his arrival in India, Brown attended the Officer Cadet Training Unit in Bangalore, and was commissioned as a Second Lieutenant into the 10th/12th Frontier Force Regiment. He soon transferred to the Frontier Corps of Scouts and Militias, where he served with the South Waziristan Scouts in the North-West Frontier Province and became a proficient speaker of the Pashto language. In 1943, Brown was posted to the Gilgit Agency, where he would spend the next three years and also learn the Shina and Burushaski languages. In 1946, he served briefly with the Tochi Scouts in North Waziristan, and in 1947, he was posted to Chitral as the Acting Commandant of the Scouts.

Partition of India and First Indo−Pakistani War 
On 3 June 1947, control of the Gilgit Agency was transferred to the princely state of Jammu and Kashmir. The state's Maharaja, Hari Singh, appointed Brigadier Ghansar Singh to govern the area on his behalf. The Partition of India took place in August of that year, which divided the former British colony into a Hindu-majority India and a Muslim-majority Pakistan. On 22 October 1947, amidst Pakistani fears of the Maharaja potentially acceding his Muslim-majority princely state to India, state-backed Pashtun tribal militias from Pakistan invaded Jammu and Kashmir and attacked the Maharaja's state forces. As Pakistani militias closed in on the capital of Srinagar by 26 October, Hari Singh had fled from the princely state and signed an instrument of accession for Jammu and Kashmir with India. The decision by the Maharaja—a Hindu Dogra ruler governing a princely state with a Muslim-majority populace—to accede to a Hindu-majority India following the creation of Pakistan was seen as controversial. Dogra rule was unpopular and disliked in every part of the princely state outside of the Jammu region; Prem Nath Bazaz, a Kashmiri scholar, describes Dogra rule in his book as:

On hearing of the decision, Brown urged Ghansar Singh to ascertain the wishes of the Gilgit Agency's Muslim community over the accession, and warned him that he may have to take certain measures to avoid large-scale bloodshed. Brown's view on the escalating Kashmir conflict was that the whole of the princely state of Jammu and Kashmir, including Gilgit, should go to Pakistan in view of the fact that the state's population was predominantly Muslim, and that the foundation of Pakistan's existence was the accommodation of Muslim-majority regions in British India. Singh ignored the warning, prompting Brown to begin planning what became known as 'Operation Datta Khel'.

Brown was well aware of the anti-Maharaja sentiments among the populace of the Gilgit Agency. On 31 October, the Gilgit Scouts, under the command of Brown, surrounded the Gilgit Residency and took Col. Ghansar Singh & Wazir-i-wazarat Sehdev Singh Chib along with their families and staff into protective custody. Brown then requested for troops to be sent to the Gilgit Agency from Pakistan and established a de facto military administration on 1 November. On assuming direct control of the region, Brown thwarted plans by a large section of his contingent to set up an independent republic called Gilgit−Astor. On 2 November, he hoisted the Pakistani flag over the capital residency and announced the accession of the Gilgit Agency to Pakistan. He was then instructed by Sir George Cunningham, the then-Governor of the North West Frontier Province to restore order in the region. On 16 November, the Pakistani government sent Muhammad Alam to take control of the region as a political agent and on 18 November, Gilgit and its neighbouring states signed a combined instrument of accession to Pakistan. Brown remained in command of the Gilgit Scouts until 12 January 1948, when he was replaced by Aslam Khan.

Brown's actions were strongly condemned by the Indian government who regarded it as an unlawful and unpopular coup, whereas the Pakistani government hailed it claiming that Brown had the full support of the people. Brown himself acknowledged the severity of his actions when he later remarked, "my actions appeared to possess all the elements of high treason. Yet I knew in my own mind that what I had done was right."

Brown is also credited to have saved the Hindu minority in Gilgit from being harmed during the war, taking personal risk in doing so.

In 1998, Brown's diary from his time in Gilgit was published as a book titled The Gilgit Rebellion.

Later life and return to the United Kingdom
After returning from Gilgit in January 1948, Brown transferred to the Frontier Constabulary, where he served for the next two years. In July 1948, he was awarded the Order of the British Empire by the British government. Brown remained in Pakistan until 1959, when he returned to the United Kingdom with his family. In 1960, he established a livery yard and riding school at St. Boswells in Scotland. Brown died of a heart attack on 5 December 1984, eight days before his 62nd birthday.

The Government of Pakistan posthumously awarded the Sitara-i-Imtiaz to Brown in 1993.

References

1922 births
1984 deaths
British people in colonial India
Recipients of Sitara-i-Imtiaz
People educated at St. Mary's School, Melrose
People educated at George Watson's College
Scottish expatriates in Pakistan
History of Gilgit-Baltistan